Martin Damm & Leander Paes were the defending champions. They were both present but did not compete together.
Damm partnered with Pavel Vízner, but lost in the first round to Eric Butorac and Andy Murray.
Paes partnered with Paul Hanley, but lost in the quarterfinals to Daniel Nestor and Nenad Zimonjić.

Jonathan Erlich and Andy Ram won in the final 6–4, 6–4 against Daniel Nestor and Nenad Zimonjić.

Seeds

Draw

Finals

Top half

Bottom half

External links
Draw

2008 Pacific Life Open
Pacific Life Open